Bricqueville is a commune in the Calvados department in the Normandy region in northwestern France.

Population

See also
Communes of the Calvados department
Bricqueville-la-Blouette
Bricqueville-sur-Mer

References

Communes of Calvados (department)
Calvados communes articles needing translation from French Wikipedia